The South Morava (Macedonian and Serbian: Јужна Морава,  Južna Morava,) is a river in eastern Kosovo and in southern Serbia, which represents the shorter headwater of Great Morava. Today, it is 295 km long, including its source river Binačka Morava. It flows generally in the south to north direction, from the Macedonian border to Kosovo and onwards to Central Serbia, where it meets West Morava at Stalać, to create Great Morava.

Sources 

The river rises in the Skopska Crna Gora mountain north of Skopje, in North Macedonia. The streams Ključevska reka and Slatinska reka join to form the river Golema, which is, after passing the Macedonian-Serbian border, known as the Binačka Morava. After 49 km it meets the Moravica (further upstream called Preševska Moravica) at Bujanovac, and for the remainder, 246 km, flows as the South Morava.

Geography 
The South Morava belongs to the Black Sea drainage basin, and its own drainage area is 15,696 km2, of which 1,237 km2 is in Bulgaria (through its right tributary Nišava). Its average discharge at the mouth is 100 m³/s and it is not navigable.

South Morava has a composite valley, which means it consists of series of gorges and valleys in this order: Gnjilane valley – Končulj gorge – Vranje valley – Grdelica gorge – Leskovac valley – Niš valley – Aleksinac valley – Stalać gorge. After breaking through the last, Stalać gorge, it meets the West Morava.

In macro-geological terms, the South Morava connects the Aegean basin with Pannonian basin. This creates a phenomenon named "apparent flow inversion": it seems that the river from one lowland climbs up the mountains and then flows into another lowland. However these two large geological basins are connected by the Grdelica gorge (Serbian: Grdelička klisura/Грделичка клисура). The bottom of the gorge, where the river flows, is much lower than the mountains surrounding it, and of course the river flows downwards through the gorge.

The South Morava used to be 318 km long, and represented a longer and natural (flowing in the same direction) headwater of Great Morava. Historically it sometimes caused severe floods. But the river's meanders have now been shortened by almost 30 km; and today it is shorter than the West Morava. However, the West Morava has always had bigger discharge.

Areas in southern Serbia where the South Morava flows have been almost completely deforested, which has caused one of the most severe cases of erosion in the Balkans. As a result of this, the river brings large amounts of materials to the Great Morava, filling and elevating its river bed, which exacerbates the huge floods of its daughter river.

Tributaries 
The South Morava has 157 tributaries. The most important left tributaries are: Jablanica, Veternica, Pusta reka and Toplica. Right tributaries are: Vrla, Vlasina, Nišava (the longest) and Sokobanjska Moravica.

Economy 
The South Morava has a significant potential for electricity production, and a huge hydroelectrical system (Vlasina- Vrla I-IV power stations) has been constructed in its drainage basin.

To a certain extent, its waters are used for irrigation.

The river valley's most important role is as a channel for transportation. It is the natural route for both railway and highway between Belgrade–Skopje–Thessaloniki. It is part of the Pan-European corridor X, and the route of the E75 Highway.

Historical name
This historical name derives from the Ottoman times when it was considered that as a whole the river was a natural border between Bulgarians from the east side, and Serbs and Albanians from the west one. A detailed ethnographic map of the then mixed (Albanian, Serbian and Bulgarian) population of the western bank of Bulgarian Morava Valley was made by Hahn and Zach in 1861.

See also 
 Pčinja River

Notes and references 

Notes

General

 Mala Prosvetina Enciklopedija, Third edition (1985); Prosveta; 
 Jovan Đ. Marković (1990): "Enciklopedijski geografski leksikon Jugoslavije"; Svjetlost-Sarajevo;

External links 
 PIM "Ivan Milutinović", Belgrade, Serbia
 Morava - Vardar (Axios) Navigation Route  (About 1,200 km shorter route (three days shorter time of navigation) from Belgrade to Port of Thessaloniki than across Danube, Black Sea and Aegean Sea. Electric power production, improvement of water quality and regulation of flooding wave.)
 Morava - Vardar (Axios) Navigation Route map
  (Concepts of regulation of rivers Great Morava and South Morava for navigation and hydropower production.)
 Macedonia's way to the Danube
 

Rivers of Serbia
Rivers of Kosovo
Rivers of North Macedonia
 
Geography of Gjilan District